Albert Woods was an English footballer who played in the Football League for Gillingham as a left half.

Career statistics

References 

English footballers
English Football League players
Gillingham F.C. players
Brentford F.C. players

1907 births
Association football wing halves
People from Faversham
Year of death missing